I'm a Celebrity...Get Me Out of Here! returned for its nineteenth series on 17 November 2019 on ITV. This series featured Anthony McPartlin's return as the show’s co-host, who was replaced by This Morning co-presenter Holly Willoughby in 2018, after deciding to take a year’s hiatus from television. He appeared again alongside Declan Donnelly. The series opening episode was watched by 13.17 million people.

Due to the bushfires in and around the region, Australian authorities put a total fire ban into place. This means that there was no campfire for the first time in the show’s history. Instead, camp mates were given a gas stove to cook on, and were required to pump gas as a replacement task to carrying firewood. Additionally, fireworks and sparklers could not be used when contestants crossed the exit bridge after being voted out of the jungle like in previous years, so they were replaced by confetti cannons. Also, despite it still being used as a prop in the jungle setup, the bath was not allowed to be used because of potential health problems due to the rusting of the metal.

A constant change in this series was the end of Bushtucker Trials involving the eating of live bugs. Whilst the stars can still be covered in live bugs, all bugs eaten will already be dead. This change was welcomed by wildlife experts and activists, including wildlife presenter Chris Packham.

On 8 December 2019, the series was won by Jacqueline Jossa, with Andy Whyment finishing as the runner-up.

Celebrities
The line-up was confirmed on 11 November 2019. On 20 November, ITV confirmed that Andrew Whyment and Cliff Parisi would join the series as the annual late arrivals. Of the contestants, Jenner previously participated on the 2003 American edition I'm a Celebrity under her pre-transition identity of Bruce Jenner.

Results and elimination
 Indicates that the celebrity was immune from the vote.
 Indicates that the celebrity received the most votes from the public.
 Indicates that the celebrity received the fewest votes and was eliminated immediately (no bottom two).
 Indicates that the celebrity received the second fewest votes and was eliminated after being in the bottom two.
 Indicates that the celebrity was named as being in the bottom two. 
 Indicates that the celebrity received the second fewest votes and was not named in the bottom two

Notes
 The celebrities competed in a series of challenges to become "uncursed" and earn immunity. Ian, James and Myles became immune by the end of the challenges.
 All app votes were voided for this elimination, as a result of a wording error; only phone votes were counted.
 The public voted for who they wanted to win, rather than save.

Bushtucker trials
The contestants take part in daily trials to earn food. These trials aim to test both physical and mental abilities. The winner is usually determined by the number of stars collected during the trial, with each star representing a meal earned by the winning contestant for their camp friends.

 The public voted for who they wanted to face the trial
 The contestants decided who would face the trial
 The trial was compulsory and neither the public nor celebrities decided who took part

Notes
 Only campmates from Snake Rock were eligible for this trial, as a result of losing the entry challenge.
 The chosen contestant (Jacqueline) had to pick one other person to do the trial with her.
 Only campmates from main camp were eligible for this trial.
 Cliff was ruled out on medical grounds.
 Andy, Kate, Myles and Nadine were doing a separate, bigger trial in order to try and win care packages.
 Celebrities are competing against each other. Only the two celebrities who complete the task quickest, will win a meal.
 Celebrities were competing for both meals and immunity from the first public vote-off. The losing celebrities in this trial (Andrew, Andy, Caitlyn, Cliff, Jacqueline and Nadine) were automatically put up for the vote-off.
 Cliff was unable to participate in this trial due to illness. James "participated" on his behalf to attempt to win immunity for him.
 The celebrities who won the fourth reckonings trial took part in the next reckoning trial to decide who was immune from the first public vote, and was the final reckoning trial of the series.

Star count

Dingo Dollar challenges
As well as 'Bushtucker Trials,' celebrities have to complete 'Dingo Dollar Challenges' in order to earn treats for the camp. At least 2 celebrities will be chosen (by camp) to compete in the challenge. These challenges often are mental challenges, rather than challenges including bugs. They must complete the challenge they have been given in order to win 'Dingo Dollars'. After completion of the challenge, the celebrities will take the Dingo Dollars and head to the Outback Shack, where they will purchase one of two snack options, from Kiosk Kev. But, before they are allowed to take the prize, the other celebrities in camp must answer a question, based on a recent survey. If they get the question right, they will earn the treat, but if they get it wrong, the celebrities will go back empty handed.

 The celebrities got the question correct
 The celebrities got the question wrong
 No question was asked

 Ian and Nadine were given the option to either; win the wagon wheels for the main camp, or the jailhouse. They chose to keep them for themselves and the main camp.
 Instead of the usual prizes, Caitlyn and James were given the option to either;  free Andy or Cliff from the jailhouse and move to the main camp. They chose Cliff. They also didn’t have to answer a question in order to free Cliff as he was released automatically.

Ratings
Official ratings are taken from BARB, utilising the four-screen dashboard which includes viewers who watched the programme on laptops, smartphones, and tablets within 7 days of the original broadcast.

References

External links
 

19
2019 British television seasons